This is a list of East Carolina University faculty. Active faculty members are listed with green backgrounds.

Faculty and staff

References

East Carolina University faculty